Vincent Marseglia (born January 24, 1986) is an American professional wrestler known for his time in Impact Wrestling, where he was a member of Honor No More. He is best known for his tenure in Ring of Honor (ROH), where he is a record setting four-time ROH World Six-Man Tag Team Champion, with three of his reigns as part of The Kingdom.

Professional wrestling career

Ring of Honor (2012–2022)

Early appearances (2012-2016)
Marseglia made his Ring of Honor (ROH) Television debut on April 7, 2012 in Baltimore, Maryland losing to Rhyno in a squash match. On April 30, 2016 Marseglia unsuccessfully challenged Jay Lethal for the ROH World Championship in West Warwick, Rhode Island.

The Kingdom (2016–2019)
Marseglia made his comeback on October 1, 2016, in Lowell, Massachusetts as a part of the revamped Kingdom stable alongside Matt Taven and T. K. O'Ryan. In their debut as a trio, they defeated The Bullet Club (Adam Cole and The Young Bucks). On the November 19 episode of ROH TV The Kingdom defeated Team CMLL (Hechicero, Okumura and Ultimo Guerrero) in the semi-finals to advance to the finals at the Final Battle 2016 PPV.

On December 2, 2016, The Kingdom became the first-ever ROH World Six-Man Tag Team Champions by defeating Kushida, Lio Rush & Jay White. They lost the title to Bully Ray and The Briscoes on March 11, 2017, in a match, where Silas Young replaced an injured T. K. O'Ryan.

On May 9, 2018 at ROH/NJPW War of the Worlds Tour, The Kingdom would regain the ROH World Six-Man Tag Team Championship by defeating SoCal Uncensored. On March 16, 2019 at Survival of the Fittest, They were defeated by Villain Enterprises for the Six-Man Tag Team Championship. On ROH Television, Marseglia attacked Taven in the ring and On December 13, 2019 at Final Battle Marseglia defeated Taven.

Impact Wrestling (2022)
At Hard To Kill Vincent made his Impact Wrestling debut after a 10-man Hardcore War tag team match attacking Rich Swann, Eddie Edwards, Heath and Rhino alongside former Kingdom stablemate Matt Taven, Mike Bennett, Maria Kanellis, and PCO. 

On October 8, 2022, it was announced that Bennett, Kanellis, Taven and Vincent had left Impact Wrestling.

Championships and accomplishments
Canadian Wrestling's Elite
CWE Championship (1 time)
Chaotic Wrestling
Chaotic Wrestling Tag Team Championship (1 time) - with Matt Taven
Liberty States Pro Wrestling 
Liberty States Heavyweight Championship (1 time)
Northeast Wrestling
NEW Tag Team Championship (2 times) - with Frankie Arion (1) and T. K. O'Ryan (1) 
Premier Wrestling Federation Northeast
PWF Northeast Lightning Cup Championship (1 time)
Pro Wrestling Illustrated
 Ranked No. 145 of the top 500 singles wrestlers in the PWI 500 in 2019
Ring of Honor
ROH World Six-Man Tag Team Championship (4 times) – with Matt Taven and T. K. O'Ryan (3) and Bateman and Dutch (1)
ROH World Six-Man Tag Team Championship Tournament (2016) – with Matt Taven and T. K. O'Ryan
Top Rope Promotions
TRP Heavyweight Championship (1 time)
TRP Interstate Championship (1 time)
Killer Kowalski Cup Tournament (2012, 2015)
Xtreme Wrestling Alliance
XWA Firebrand Championship (1 time)

References

Living people
1986 births
American male professional wrestlers
People from Warwick, Rhode Island
Professional wrestlers from Rhode Island
21st-century professional wrestlers
ROH World Six-Man Tag Team Champions